Inosanto or Innosanto may refer to the following people:
Given name
Innosanto Nagara, children's author, activist, and graphic designer born in Indonesia

Surname
Dan Inosanto (born 1936), Filipino-American martial arts instructor 
Diana Lee Inosanto (born 1966), American actress, stuntwoman and martial artist, daughter of Dan